Fantail Creek is a stream in the U.S. state of South Dakota.

Fantail Creek was named after the fantail deer observed near it.

See also
List of rivers of South Dakota

References

Rivers of Lawrence County, South Dakota
Rivers of South Dakota